Monilispira monilifera, common name one-ridge bullia, is a species of sea snail, a marine gastropod mollusk in the family Pseudomelatomidae.

Description
The length of the shell varies between 10 mm and 40 mm.

Distribution
This marine species occurs in the Pacific Ocean from Mazatlan, Mexico, to Panama

References

 Carpenter, Philip Pearsall. Report on the present state of our knowledge with regard to the Mollusca of the west coast of North America. British Association for the Advancement of Science, 1857.

External links
 
 Gastropods.com: Crassispira (Monilispira) monilifera

monilifera
Gastropods described in 1857
Taxa named by Philip Pearsall Carpenter